This article compares computer software tools which are used for accomplishing comparisons of files of various types. The file types addressed by individual file comparison apps varies, but may include text, symbols, images, audio, or video. This category of software tool is often called "file comparison" or "diff tool", but those effectively are equivalent terms — where the term "diff" is more commonly associated with the Unix diff utility.

A typical rudimentary case is the comparison of one file against another. However, it also may include comparisons between two populations of files, such as in the case of comparing directories or folders, as part of file management. For instance, this might be to detect problems with corrupted backup versions of a collection of files ... or to validate a package of files is in compliance with standards before publishing.

Note that comparisons must be made among the same file type. Meaning, a text file cannot be compared to a picture containing text, unless an optical character reader (OCR) process is done first to extract the text. Likewise, text cannot be compared to spoken words, unless the spoken words first are transcribed into text. Additionally, text in one language cannot be compared to text in another, unless one is translated into the language of other.

A critical consideration is how the two files being compared must be substantially similar and thus not radically different. Even different revisions of the same document — if there are many changes due to additions, removals, or moving of content — may make comparisons of file changes very difficult to interpret. This suggests frequent version saves of a critical document, to better facilitate a file comparison.

A "diff" file comparison tool is a vital time and labor saving utility, because it aids in accomplishing tedious comparisons. Thus, it is a vital part of demanding comparison processes employed by individuals, academics, legal arena, forensics field, and other professional endeavors — to identify sometimes hard to spot differences needed for detecting.

These uses include:

 Revisions of texts, plans, or drawings.
 Edit changes in media.
 Omission of credit for quotes, citations, extracts, or exemplars.
 Plagiarism.
 Alteration of legal documents.
 Fraud.
 Forgery.
 Fakery, or "deepfake" to impersonate.
 Disputes over ownership or credit for cooperative efforts.
 Chronology of evolution of a project or effort.
 Detect steganography (the practice of hiding data in plain sight).
 Uncover removal of watermarks.
 Intentional defacement.
 Identification of graffiti, tattoo, or other cultural mark with a signature style.
 Unintentional or incidental damage.
Changes in health of living being.
 Risk evaluation of propagation of structural damage.
 Evaluation for restoration.
 Degradation due to effects of environmental exposure over time, including natural entropy (decline over time):
 Oxidation.
 Rain exposure.
 Abrasion from wind-driven sand.
 Weathering from environmental changes in temperature, such as caused by freeze-thaw cycles.
 Fugitive (i.e. no permanent) pigments in paintings or printed materials from exposure to ultraviolet light.
 Exposure to vibration, such as industrial processes are from vehicular traffic.

General
Basic general information about file comparison software.

Compare features

API / editor features

Other features
Some other features which did not fit in previous table

Aspects
What aspects can be / are compared?

Time zone effects
When files are transferred across time zones and between Microsoft FAT and NTFS file systems, the timestamp displayed by the same file may change, so that identical files with different storage histories are deemed different by a comparer that requires the timestamps to match. The difference is an exact number of quarters of an hour up to 95 (same minutes modulo 15 and seconds) if the file was transported across zones; there is also a one-hour difference within a single zone caused by the transition between standard time and daylight saving time (DST). Some, but not all, file comparison and synchronisation software can be configured to ignore the DST and time-zone differences. Software known to have daylight-saving compensation is marked in the Aspects table.

See also
 File comparison
 File synchronization
 Comparison of file synchronization software
 List of disk cloning software
 Comparison of disk cloning software
 Comparison of hex editors

References

File comparison tools